This article details statistics relating to the Washington Commanders, a club member of the National Football League (NFL).

Passing

Yardage

Completions

Touchdowns

Receiving

Receptions

Receiving yards

Receiving touchdowns

Rushing

Rushes

Rushing yards

Touchdowns

Kick and punt returning

Kick return yards

Yards per return

Return touchdowns

References

External links
 Pro Football Reference

records
American football team records and statistics